Qteros, Inc. is an American energy company researching the production of cellulosic ethanol from a variety of non-food feedstock sources including corn stover, corn cobs, switchgrass, and sugar cane bagasse.

Qteros's process combines proprietary science and microbiology that enables a simplified biomass-to-ethanol conversion. Their proprietary microorganism is the Q Microbe® (Clostridium phytofermentans).

In January 2011, Qteros announced its partnership with Praj Industries of India, a publicly traded builder of ethanol plants. Praj Industries has built about 70% of the 400 ethanol mills in India.
ny_financials</ref>

In November 2011, the company reduced staff and sought additional financing.

Change of Management and Ownership
In late 2012, Qteros went through a change of management and ownership, with founding COO Stephen Rogers taking over the role of CEO. Qteros continues to develop and scale its technology in collaboration with significant international partners.

References

Companies based in Middlesex County, Massachusetts
Energy companies of the United States